Keokea  is an unincorporated community and census-designated place (CDP) on the island of Maui in Maui County, Hawaii, United States. It is situated on Hawaii State Highway 37 (the Kula Highway) at North Latitude 20.71 degrees, West Longitude 156.36 degrees. As of the 2020 census its population was 2,199, up from 1,612 in 2010.

Agriculture, forestry and ranching — supported by the area's fertile though often rocky volcanic loams — are important around this settlement, which has a temperate climate because of its elevation. Tourism also contributes to the local economy.

Geography
Keokea is bordered to the north by the community of Kula, while to the southeast is the Kula Forest Preserve, ascending to  Pu'ukeōkea.

References

External links

Keokea, Maui County, Hawaii, USA at Place Names.com
Web Soil Survey

Populated places on Maui
Unincorporated communities in Maui County, Hawaii
Unincorporated communities in Hawaii
Census-designated places in Maui County, Hawaii
Census-designated places in Hawaii